The 1999 FIS Ski Jumping Grand Prix was the 6th Summer Grand Prix season in ski jumping on plastic. Season began on 6 August 1999 in Hinterzarten, Germany and ended on 15 September 1999 in Sapporo.

Other competitive circuits this season included the World Cup and Continental Cup.

Calendar

Men

Men's team

Standings

Overall

Nations Cup

References

FIS Grand Prix Ski Jumping
FIS Grand Prix Ski Jumping